Nina Ivanova (6 January 1934 – 1 December 2020) was a Russian-Soviet actress.

Filmography
Once There Was a Girl (1944)
Nadia (1955)
Spring on Zarechnaya Street (1956)
The Heirs (1960)
Lyubovyu nado dorozhit (1960)
Trainers of the Russian Circus (1960)
Confession (1962)
Shura Chooses the Sea (1964)
An Easy Life (1964)
There Is Such a Lad (1964)
Seraja bolezn (1966)
Theft (1970)
You Can Still Be On Time (1974)

References

1934 births
2020 deaths
Soviet film actresses
Russian film actresses
Actresses from Moscow